A Day Off is a South Korean drama film directed by Lee Man-hee. Shot and completed in 1968 but not released due to censorship, it opened to the public in 2005, 37 years later, after the original print was rediscovered during the reorganization of the Korean Film Archive's warehouse. Regarded as one of the masterpieces of 1960s Korean film and its representative modernist film, A Day Off was selected near the top of the top 100 Korean films list in 2014.

Plot
One winter Sunday, a penniless young man named Huh Wook (Shin Seong-il) sets off to meet his beloved Ji-yeon (Ji Yun-seong). Unable to start a family, Ji-yeon, who is pregnant, needs an abortion.

Cast
 Shin Seong-il as Huh Wook
 Ji Yun-seong as Ji-yeon

References

External links
 
 

2005 films
2000s Korean-language films
Films directed by Lee Man-hee (director)
South Korean drama films
2005 drama films
2000s South Korean films